Jeon So-yeon (born August 26, 1998), known mononymously as Soyeon, is a South Korean rapper, singer, songwriter, and record producer signed to Cube Entertainment. She first gained attention for competing in the television shows Produce 101 and Unpretty Rapstar before debuting as a solo artist on November 5, 2017. On May 2, 2018, she debuted as the leader and main rapper of the girl group (G)I-dle for whom she has written and produced most title songs. She is also part of SM Station X girl group project Station Young, and has portrayed League of Legends character Akali in the virtual musical groups K/DA and True Damage.

Early life
Jeon So-yeon was born on August 26, 1998, in Gaepo-dong, Gangnam-gu, Seoul, South Korea. As a child, she was home schooled and later attended Kuryong Elementary School. While in elementary school, Jeon studied ballet, entering and winning numerous competitions. After seeing Big Bang perform, she quit ballet to pursue a musical career. While still in elementary school, Jeon secretly attended and failed 20 to 30 singing auditions.

Jeon later decided to pursue rapping. She eventually gathered the courage to rap at auditions which led to her to being noticed and receiving interested calls. With the interested parties' direction of music being different from hers, she let go of her dream of becoming a singer and picked up dancing again. It was then that she began performing as a street dancer.

After seeing Cube Entertainment's 2014 audition poster, Jeon decided to audition once again and was selected in the audition held at Incheon. After passing the final round of judging, Jeon became a trainee of Cube Entertainment.

Career

2016–2017: Produce 101, Unpretty Rapstar and solo debut

In January 2016, Jeon appeared as a representative trainee for Cube Entertainment in the first season of the girl group survival show, Produce 101. She remained a popular contestant throughout the show's run, peaking at 10th place on the fifth episode. However, she ranked at number 20 on the last episode and failed to become a member of the winning girl group, I.O.I.

In July 2016, Jeon appeared as a contestant in the third season of the rap competition show Unpretty Rapstar. The show finished with Jeon as the second runner-up, gaining three tracks on the show's final compilation album.

On December 29, 2016, Jeon signed an exclusive contract as an artist under Cube Entertainment. She officially debuted on November 5, 2017, with the digital singles "Jelly" and "Idle Song", which she wrote herself.

2018–2020: Debut with (G)I-dle, collaborations with League of Legends and solo activities

On January 11, 2018, it was announced that Jeon would be re-debuting in Cube Entertainment's new girl group (G)I-dle, as the leader and rapper. She is credited in the lyrics, music and arrangement for both their debut song "Latata" and their comeback song "Hann", both of which were well received and commercially successful. She also contributed in writing five songs from (G)I-dle's debut extended play I Am.

On August 8, 2018, it was announced that Jeon would participate in a girl group project called Station Young for SM Station's X 0 alongside Red Velvet's Seulgi, Kim Chung-ha, and GFriend's SinB. Station Young released their first song, "Wow Thing", on September 28, 2018.

After their debut, Jeon and fellow (G)I-dle member Miyeon were approached by Riot Games to collaborate with American artists Jaira Burns and Madison Beer as part of a virtual girl group called K/DA for the multiplayer online battle arena video game League of Legends. K/DA officially debuted with the song "Pop/Stars" during the 2018 League of Legends World Championship on November 3. The official music video for "Pop/Stars" was released on the same day, reaching 30 million views on YouTube in five days, and 100 million in one month. The single release of the song reached number one on Billboard'''s World Digital Songs chart. The K/DA incarnation of the character Akali, whose vocals were performed by Jeon, proved to be especially popular, becoming a frequent subject of fan art and cosplay.

In 2019, Jeon composed labelmate CLC's "No" which was selected through a blind test and served as the lead single. In March 2019, Jeon made a public apology for using a pirated version of the German music-producing software, Kontakt. She wrote on her online fan community site, "I deeply regret that I used an illegal copy of the program; as far as I remember, I used it when I first learned songwriting. I had not even recognized that I did not delete the program. But since the day I began composing in earnest, I have only used authorized programs." The apology came days after a behind-the-scenes YouTube video of preparing the I Made EP, produced by the agency, showed icons of the software's illegal copy on her laptop screen. The agency later deleted the video and apologized.

Jeon reprised her role as Akali, in the League of Legends collaborative hip hop group True Damage. A collaboration with Becky G, Keke Palmer, Thutmose and Duckwrth, titled "Giants", was released as a single alongside an animated music video on November 10, 2019. The song is a multilingual track performed predominantly in English, with verses in Spanish and Korean. On the same day, the group performed at the 2019 League of Legends World Championship finals in Paris, France. It was Jeon's second year in a row to perform at the opening ceremony of the World Championship finals. "Giants" debuted at number fifteen and nineteen at Billboard's Rap and R&B/Hip hop Digital Songs Sales charts, respectively.

In 2020, Jeon made her appearance on Mnet's new Hip Hop inspired Do You Know Hip Hop. The show features rappers who promoted from the late 1990s-2000s and pioneered the hip hop genre in Korea and a guest that have an undying enthusiasm for hip hop. On February 28, she appeared as one of the "young rappers" to collaborate with Double K and Nuck performing "2020 Lion remix" for Old & Young collaboration stage. In April, (G)I-dle released their third EP, I Trust. All of the songs on the album, including the lead single "Oh My God" was written and composed by Jeon and longtime collaborator Yummy Tone. The song was released in two languages: English and Korean. On July 22, Jeon featured on DJ Hyo's track "Dessert" with rapper Loopy. The song is a jungle pop genre with bouncy beat and catchy moombahton rhythm, clever and memorable hook that uses various synthesizer, claps and whistles with message of wanting a sweet love rather than difficult and complex and is expressed with dessert. In an interview with Melon, DJ Hyo revealed the reason she chose Jeon is because "she is an exceptionally talented person in many ways, so I wanted to do the collab together with her". Jeon took part in writing and composing the song. In August, Jeon composed the group's first summer song "Dumdi Dumdi" alongside Pop Time, who has produced many of Zico and Block B's hit songs.

On August 27, 2020, she reprised her role as League of Legends character Akali in "The Baddest" and "More", on K/DA's All Out (EP). Jeon took part in producing Apink's Namjoo solo debut song "Bird", which was released on September 7. On December 16, it was confirmed that Jeon, Pentagon's Hui, and AB6IX's Lee Dae-hwi would be producing songs for the Top 7 competition on Mnet's audition show CAP-TEEN. The song "Eternal Sunshine" is sung by Lee Seo-bin. It is a song with a groovy rhythm of guitar and bass that stands out, expressing the feelings of first love. Lee Seo-bin received overall good reviews and received a total score of 354 from the judges.

2021–present: First solo EP Windy
In January 2021, Jeon wrote four of the six songs included on (G)I-dle's EPI Burn, including the lead single "Hwaa". The same month, Jeon appeared on Face ID, a KakaoTV's original entertainment show that reveals the everyday lifestyle of celebrities through their phones. The show aired every Monday for three weeks from January 25. In the episodes, she revealed the production process of many of her acclaimed songs, daily lives with (G)I-dle members, 1,600 demo songs, and behind-the-scenes video from the preparation of I Burn to the day of their comeback. On May 21, 2021, it was reported that Jeon would be releasing a solo album. On June 16, 2021, Cube Entertainment announced that her first EP, Windy, was to be released on July 5, with "Beam Beam" serving as the lead single. Jeon won her first music program trophy at SBS MTV's The Show on July 13.

Philanthropy
In April 2020, Jeon donated 30,000 hand sanitizers to overcome the COVID-19 pandemic in South Korea through the Holt Children's Welfare Association. On June 2, 2021, Jeon opened her personal Instagram account with several photos of selfies and an arm tattoo. Later, Jeon revealed the meaning of her tattoo "consent for organ donation” on V Live. The tattoo's shape is an electrocardiogram that expresses the electrical heartbeat, engraved on the body of those who wish to donate long term. She expressed, "I saw an article saying that an average of 5 people a day died waiting for an organ donor. I thought about what I could do for others in my life, and then I came to a conclusion. It was a decision I made after cautiously thinking." On January 18, 2022, Jeon donated 20,000 briquettes to the 'Sharing Briquettes of Love' campaign to help the neighbours in need, including unprivileged and low-income families who are enduring the cold winter.

In February 2023, Jeon donated 20 million won to the Hope Bridge National Disaster Relief Association in order to aid those affected by the 2023 Turkey–Syria earthquake. 

Artistry
Image
Jeon is labelled as a versatile artist. Her success as a rapper, singer and songwriter earned her the title of "Triple Threat". Jeon was described as an Alpha girl for utilising and exhibiting her skills in writing, composing, arranging, choreographing, rapping, dancing and singing. A representative from Cube noted that Jeon's presence in the group has determined the groups popularity from the start and made (G)I-dle different from other groups they debuted before. She was also named "survival born monster" due to her participation on two survival shows and has established herself as the next-generation genius "Producer-dol". RBW's Cosmic Sound Kim Ki-hyun and Cosmic Girl and former Rania member Yoo Joo-yi described her as the genius songwriter-idol. Jeon was named by Kukinews as the first successful female idol singer who took part in producing, starting from debut song "Latata" and steadily produced hit songs such as "Uh-Oh" and "Lion", and songs released by music industry senior group CLC, Apink's Kim Nam-joo, and Girls' Generation's Hyoyeon. Journalist Park Eun-hae cited Jeon as the Korean Lady Gaga due to her small figure, having the courage to try a challenging concept without being limited to a specific genre, and her rise to a unique position.

Influences
Jeon stated that her bandmates are her inspiration for songwriting. She was heavily influenced by her rap teacher when she was in high school and started to rap after she met that teacher. Jeon said: "That amazing mentor taught me the basics like how to write good lyrics and how to melt in your sincerity." She has also named CL, Britney Spears and Avril Lavigne as her role models with the latter two being the inspiration behind I Never Dies concept and fashion.

Jeon also came up with songs, albums, concepts while inspired by cartoons, books and dramas. "Idle Song" was created because she was inspired by the SpongeBob SquarePants theme song. "Latata" was inspired by Song Joon-geun's catchphrase "arata rata rata" in KBS2's Gag Concert. "Hann (Alone)" was inspired by Kim Sowol's poem "Azaleas". "Senorita" was inspired by Spanish song, "Despacito" (2017). "Uh-Oh" was inspired by the expression and the tone used by staff, where she'd shot a reality show, To Neverland in the U.S. "Lion" was inspired from live-action The Lion King during her group's debut in Japan. For I Trust album concept, Jeon revealed that she got inspired by watching an isekai anime, KonoSuba: God's Blessing on this Wonderful World! Legend of Crimson, and "Luv U" was created and choreographed from the scene heart-finger V by the animation Sugar Sugar Rune. "Dumdi Dumdi" was inspired by the 2016 Disney's Zootopia. The inspiration for "Hwaa" came to Jeon when Shuhua once said 'winter girl' in a conversation. She took the idea and created the concept of a woman trapped in winter. For I Never Die, Jeon compared the album with the Marineford war in One Piece anime series – "the war is a very important event in One Piece. The story revolves around the members who have grown up two years after fighting a war that they thought was an insurmountable crisis and like the members are separated to grow up. Like the manga, I thought I Never Die is an album that depicts (G)I-dle after the war. This album, which is represented by growth and shock, was perfected with passion and fierceness." "Tomboy" was inspired by the fictional character, Cruella de Vil.

Jeon is seen as a role model for teens, young women, various female artists, such as Majors' Aki, ANS' Dalyn, Woo!ah!'s Songyee, Craxy's KaRin Lightsum's Jian and Juhyeon, Lunarsolar's Eseo, H1-Key's Hwiseo, and male artist Blank2y's Siwoo. K-pop producer and songwriter Ryan S. Jhun said that he is a big fan of idol competition show Queendom, and also shared that he hopes to work with Jeon one day.

Songwriting and musical style

Although Jeon had been given songwriting classes while she was a trainee, she never intended to be the group's primary songwriter. She said, "At first, I really didn't know I'd be writing these songs ... but our debut was getting delayed because we didn't have a song. So that's when I thought, I should write our song, and started writing a title track."

In the production of "Latata", Jeon began with moombahton beats while considering the other members of the group. For the instruments, she used percussion. After making the beat with simple instruments, she put it on loop and coated it with melody. She described her process in composing started with writing beats and melodies on a blank page with just a piano or a beat. She continued explaining that "it is common to have a track maker, someone who writes melodies and putting a melody on a mostly completed beat." She confessed she avoids the words "me or I" in lyrics. Jeon emphasized the importance of appealing to emotions, saying, "I think it's because I'm making music without prejudice. There are various performances, but I think it's the music that anyone can sympathize with. Our group is multinational and has no language barrier."

In Queendom'''s first preliminary performance, Jeon proposed a sorceress concept of "Latata". In music critics IZM's words, it "does not look like the a rearranged version, but more like an entirely original song". The article also mentioned the reason she can consistently being confident about her team, song and herself both on and off stage is because "she has a clear image of what she wants to create." Poet Seo Hyo-in wrote that "Soyeon covers all aspects of producing, from composition and writing, rap making and setting the concept. However, she doesn't overshadow the other members." She praised Jeon for maximising the strengths of each member and allows them to find their own artistic freedom.

Gender stereotypes in music

Jeon believes that women can be producers as well and hoped that more women would come out as producers. She believes that there are no boundaries when it comes to arts forms like music, performances and gaming. "When I write, I don't think about gender. No "we're a girl group", women, men or age. I just write what's on my mind." In a June 2020 interview with MTV, Jeon discussed using the word 'she' in "Oh My God" stating, "I didn't want to limit that 'she' to a certain being or a certain definition, so it's open to anything. I believe that all kinds of love are valuable and must be respected."

Discography

Extended plays

Singles

Other charted songs

Other songs

Filmography

Television shows

Web shows

Radio shows

Music videos

Awards and nominations

Notes

References

External links

 

1998 births
Living people
People from Seoul
Cube Entertainment artists
Women songwriters
Rappers from Seoul
Singers from Seoul
South Korean Buddhists
South Korean women rappers
South Korean musicians
South Korean women musicians
South Korean record producers
South Korean women record producers
South Korean singer-songwriters
South Korean women singer-songwriters
South Korean songwriters
South Korean composers
South Korean pop singers
South Korean women pop singers
South Korean female idols
South Korean hip hop record producers
Unpretty Rapstar contestants
Produce 101 contestants
(G)I-dle members
21st-century South Korean women singers
21st-century South Korean singers
21st-century women rappers
K/DA members
Jeon So-yeon
English-language singers from South Korea
Japanese-language singers of South Korea
Mandarin-language singers of South Korea